Sir Richard Antony Pilkington,  (10 May 1908 – 9 December 1976) was a British Conservative Party politician and a soldier in the British Army.

Early life
Richard Pilkington was born in St Helens to the Chairman of the Pilkington glass works, Arthur Pilkington, and Marjorie Cope, daughter of  the painter Arthur Stockdale Cope. He was educated at Charterhouse and Christ Church, Oxford. He worked and travelled in North America from 1928 until 1930 when he joined the Coldstream Guards, serving in Sudan and Egypt.

Military and political career
In 1935 he resigned his commission to enter politics and was elected as Member of Parliament (MP) for Widnes in Lancashire. He served as Parliamentary Private Secretary to Oliver Stanley. On the outbreak of the Second World War he rejoined the Army and travelled to France with the British Expeditionary Force. He was awarded the Military Cross after returning with one of the last groups from Dunkirk in 1940.

He left the Army again in 1942 and became a Civil Lord of the Admiralty, leading naval missions to India, Ceylon and Burma. He lost his seat to Christopher Shawcross in 1945 and lost again in 1950. In 1951 he won election as Member of Parliament for Poole in Dorset, a seat he held until his retirement from politics in 1964 after a car accident and the onset of Parkinson's disease. He died from the disease in 1976 at the age of 68.

Personal life
Richard Pilkington was also known for his collection of cars, all red, a passion shared by his nephew Sir Antony Pilkington.

References

 Obituaries, The Times, page 17, 13 December 1976.

External links
 

1908 births
1976 deaths
Military personnel from Lancashire
Admiralty personnel of World War II
Alumni of Christ Church, Oxford
British Army personnel of World War II
Coldstream Guards officers
Conservative Party (UK) MPs for English constituencies
Neurological disease deaths in England
Deaths from Parkinson's disease
Knights Commander of the Order of the British Empire
Lords of the Admiralty
Ministers in the Churchill caretaker government, 1945
Ministers in the Churchill wartime government, 1940–1945
People educated at Charterhouse School
People from St Helens, Merseyside
Recipients of the Military Cross
UK MPs 1935–1945
UK MPs 1951–1955
UK MPs 1955–1959
UK MPs 1959–1964